The Andrea Moda S921 was a Formula One car designed by Simtek and used by the Andrea Moda Formula team in the 1992 Formula One season. It was driven by the experienced Brazilian Roberto Moreno and Englishman Perry McCarthy.

The S921 used the Judd GV V10 engine.

The plans for the car had been purchased from Nick Wirth's Simtek Research, who had originally designed the machine in 1990 for BMW's proposed entry into Formula 1. The design was then revived and updated; two chassis were built for Moreno and McCarthy.
 
The car was highly unsuccessful and its best result was at the 1992 Monaco Grand Prix; Moreno managed to get through the Friday pre-qualifying session, and then qualified in 26th place for the race. After the first qualifying session on Thursday standing 20th, managed in total 11 laps, reaching as high as 19th place before retiring with engine failure.

The team was expelled from the championship after team owner Andrea Sassetti was arrested at Spa for financial irregularities, and following an FIA ruling following the arrest that the team was not run "in a manner compatible with the standards of the championship or in any way brings the championship into disrepute." The team did still turn up at Monza for the next Grand Prix but was banned from entering the paddock.
 
The team finished last in the Constructors' Championship, with no points.

Complete Formula One results
(key) (results in bold indicate pole position, results in italics indicate fastest lap)

References 

 Lapped Legends
 F1 STATS

External links 
 Andrea Moda profile on F1 Rejects
 Andrea Moda profile on Chequered Flag Motorsports
 Car Statistics on STATSF1
 'Running on Empty' ESPN F1 Story

Formula One cars